Mount Cara is a peak,  high, standing  north-northwest of Mount Lysaght in the Queen Elizabeth Range. It was named by the British Antarctic Expedition, 1907–09.

References 

Mountains of the Ross Dependency
Shackleton Coast